Anna-Liisa Bezrodny (born on 10 September 1981 Moscow) is an Estonian/Finnish violinist.

She has studied violin at Sibelius Academy and Guildhall School of Music and Drama in London.

She is a member of Estonian Association of Professional Musicians.

Awards
She has won many awards around the world:
 III prize at the International Kocian Violin Competition in Czech Republic (1995)
 I prize at the International Frankfurt Music Festival (1999)
 winner of Estonian round of Eurovision Young Musicians (2000)
 ETV prize at competition-festival for Estonia's young musicians "Con brio" (2002)
 III prize at International Jascha Heifetz Competition in Vilnius (2005)
 II prize at Johannes Brahms Competition in Austria, Pörtschach (2006)
 Annual Award of the Edowment for Music of Cultural Endowment of Estonia (2013)

References

Living people
1981 births
Estonian violinists